Compute!'s Gazette, stylized as COMPUTE!'s Gazette, was a computer magazine of the 1980s, directed at users of Commodore's 8-bit home computers. Announced as The Commodore Gazette, it was a Commodore-only daughter magazine of the computer hobbyist magazine Compute!. It was first published in July 1983.

It contained both standard articles and type-in programs. Many of these programs were quite long and sophisticated. To assist in entry, Gazette published several utilities. The Automatic Proofreader provided checksum capabilities for BASIC programs, while machine language listings could be entered with MLX. Starting in May 1984, a companion disk with each issue's programs was available to subscribers for an extra fee. Perhaps its most popular and enduring type-in application was the SpeedScript word processor. A monthly column, "The VIC Magician" by Michael Tomczyk, presented BASIC programming tips and tricks for the VIC-20 and Commodore 64.

The publication was reportedly profitable from its first issue, but towards the end of the 1980s, its size steadily decreased due to the increasing switch from 8-bit to 16-bit home computers. The last stand-alone issue of Compute!'s Gazette was published with cover date June 1990. At that point, the Compute! brand, including Gazette, was sold to the publishers of Omni and Penthouse. After a three-month publication hiatus, Gazette resumed publication, as an insert in the newly consolidated (and renamed) Compute (October 1990 issue) rather than as a separate magazine. It continued until December 1993, after which it switched to a disk-only format. Due to the declining Commodore userbase, publication ceased entirely after February 12, 1995.

References

External links
 Compute!'s Gazette at the Internet Archive
 Compute!'s Gazette Index – At the Classic Computer Magazine Archive, assembled by Kevin Savetz
 Compute!'s Gazette at DLH's Commodore Archive website

Monthly magazines published in the United States
Commodore 8-bit computer magazines
Defunct computer magazines published in the United States
Magazines disestablished in 1995
Magazines established in 1983